The 1971 Pepsi-Cola Grand Prix was a tennis circuit administered by the International Lawn Tennis Federation which served as a forerunner to the current Association of Tennis Professionals (ATP) World Tour and the Women's Tennis Association (WTA) Tour. The circuit consisted of the four modern Grand Slam tournaments and open tournaments recognised by the ILTF. This article covers all tournaments that were part of that year's Women's Grand Prix.

Schedule

Key

May

June

July

August

September

October

Grand Prix Entry Rankings

Statistical Information

Titles won by player
These tables present the number of singles (S), doubles (D), and mixed doubles (X) titles won by each player and each nation during the season, within all the tournament categories of the 1971 Women's Grand Prix circuit: the Grand Slam tournaments and regular events. The players/nations are sorted by:

 total number of titles;
 highest amount of highest category tournaments (for example, having a single Grand Slam gives preference over any kind of combination without a Grand Slam title); 
 a singles > doubles > mixed doubles hierarchy; 
 alphabetical order (by family names for players).

The following players won their first title in 1971:

See also
 1971 World Championship Tennis circuit
 1971 Men's Grand Prix (tennis)

References

External links
 ATP Archive 1971: Pepsi Cola Grand Prix Tournaments
History Mens Professional Tours

Further reading

Women's Grand Prix